The Zomandao River is a 283-km-long river in the regions of Haute Matsiatra and Ihorombe in central-southern Madagascar. It begins in the Andringitra Massif at Boby Peak, the second highest peak of Madagascar, and flows across the Zomandao Plain. It is one of the main tributaries of the Mangoky River. It has some waterfalls, including the Riandahy Falls and Rianbavy Falls.

A main attribute to the Zomandao River is the Ihosy River.

References
Aldegheri 1972. Rivers and streams on Madagascar. Dr. W. Junk B.V. Publishers

Rivers of Haute Matsiatra
Rivers of Ihorombe
Rivers of Madagascar